St. Andrew Bay, colloquially called "St. Andrews Bay", is a bay located in Bay County in the panhandle of Florida. It is a 69,000-acre estuary located in northwest Florida. It is relatively deep, and of relatively high salinity due to the low freshwater inflow provided by only a few spring-fed creeks (the most significant being Econfina Creek, fed by Wiliford and Pitts Springs).  The county seat of Bay County, Panama City, is located on the bay, named for Saint Andrew.  The Atlanta & St. Andrews Bay Railway, which ran from Panama City to Dothan, Alabama (and still exists as a smaller short line), was also named for the bay.

History
St. Andrew Bay was the location of a large number of saltworks critical for the Confederacy during the American Civil War. Edward Crissey, in command of the steamboat USS Bloomer, which he had been instrumental in stealing from her berth near Geneva, Alabama, helped destroy numerous salt works, doing great damage to the Confederate war effort. The shallow draft of the steamboat allowed her to go up inlets where other, deeper draft vessels had been unable to travel.

Wildlife
Wild dolphin are commonly seen in the waters of St. Andrew Bay; they are easily spotted when the waters are smooth in the mornings. In shallower waters, St. Andrew Bay is known for vast schools of mullet, redfish and speckled trout. Occasionally a manatee is spotted in the bay as well.

References

Bodies of water of Bay County, Florida
Bays of Florida on the Gulf of Mexico